Ha Matela may refer to:
Ha Matela, a village in Makhoarane, Lesotho
Ha Matela, a village in 'Moteng, Lesotho
Ha Matela, a village in Ratau, Lesotho